Soeur or Sœur (French, 'sister'), or variants, may refer to:

 Soeur System, a fictional element from the Japanese media franchise Maria-sama ga Miteru (Marimite)
 Île des Soeurs, or Nuns' Island, part of Montreal, Quebec, Canada
 Iles Soeurs, Seychelles (Souers Islands), an island group:
 Grande Soeur, Seychelles
 Petite Soeur, Seychelles

See also

 
 
 Sister (disambiguation)
 Sour (disambiguation)
 Île des Sœurs (disambiguation)
 Petite soeur (disambiguation)
 Demi-soeur, a film
 Les Belles-sœurs, a play
 "Ma sœur" ('My Sister'), a 2007 song by Vitaa
 Nun, a member of a religious community of women
 Seur, a place in France